NC186 is an oil field located in the southwest of Ubari, Libya. It is operated by Repsol.

See also 

 List of oil fields

Oil fields of Libya